Progress 5, was a Soviet unmanned Progress cargo spacecraft which was launched in 1979 to resupply the Salyut 6 space station.  Served as a receptacle for contaminated fuel from the damaged Salyut 6 propulsion system.

Spacecraft
Progress 5 was a Progress 7K-TG spacecraft. The fifth of forty three to be launched, it had the serial number 104. The Progress 7K-TG spacecraft was the first generation Progress, derived from the Soyuz 7K-T and intended for uncrewed logistics missions to space stations in support of the Salyut programme. On some missions the spacecraft were also used to adjust the orbit of the space station.

The spacecraft were powered by chemical batteries, and could operate in free flight for up to three days, remaining docked to the station for up to thirty.

Launch
Progress 5 launched on 12 March 1979 from the Baikonur Cosmodrome in the Kazakh Soviet Socialist Republic. It used a Soyuz-U rocket.

Docking
Progress 5 docked with Salyut 6 on 14 March 1979 at 07:19:21 UTC.

Decay
It remained in orbit until 5 April 1979, when it was deorbited. The deorbit burn occurred at 01:04 UTC.

See also

 1979 in spaceflight
 List of Progress missions
 List of uncrewed spaceflights to Salyut space stations

References

Progress (spacecraft) missions
1979 in the Soviet Union
Spacecraft launched in 1979
Spacecraft which reentered in 1979
Spacecraft launched by Soyuz-U rockets